Ndhiwa Constituency is an electoral constituency in Kenya. It is one of eight constituencies in Homa Bay County. The constituency has seven wards, all electing councillors to the Homa Bay County Council.

Members of Parliament

Wards

References 

Constituencies in Homa Bay County
Constituencies in Nyanza Province